Ameiva bifrontata, known as Cope's ameiva, is a species of teiid lizard found in Peru, Colombia, Venezuela, Netherlands Antilles, and Aruba.

References

Ameiva
Reptiles described in 1862
Taxa named by Edward Drinker Cope
Lizards of South America
Reptiles of Venezuela